The Bottoms may refer to:

The Bottoms (novel), a 2000 novel by Joe R. Lansdale
The Bottoms (SSSI), a protected area in England
The Bottoms, an area in Franklinton (Columbus, Ohio), United States
"The Bottoms", an episode of American TV series Hap and Leonard

See also
 Bottom (disambiguation)